John Philip Madden (born 8 April 1949) is an English director of stage, film, television, and radio. He is known for directing Shakespeare in Love (1998), which won the Academy Award for Best Picture. He has also gained recognition for directing The Best Exotic Marigold Hotel (2012) and its sequel The Second Best Exotic Marigold Hotel (2015).

Life and career
Madden was born in Portsmouth, Hampshire, England. He was educated at Clifton College in Bristol. He was in the same house as Roger Michell, who became a friend and later also a director. He began his career in British independent films, and graduated from Sidney Sussex College, Cambridge in 1970 with a B.A. in English Literature.

He started work in television, including directing Helen Mirren in Prime Suspect 4, episodes of The Adventures of Sherlock Holmes (ITV, 1984–1994), and Inspector Morse (1990–1995).

He directed the film Shakespeare in Love (1998), which won the Academy Award for Best Picture and for which he was also nominated as Best Director. He lost to Steven Spielberg, who directed Saving Private Ryan. The film also won the Silver Bear at the 49th Berlin International Film Festival.

Madden has since directed several films, including Proof (2005), The Best Exotic Marigold Hotel (2011), and its sequel, The Second Best Exotic Marigold Hotel (2015).

Madden is serving as a Jury Member for the digital studio Filmaka, a platform for undiscovered filmmakers to show their work to industry professionals.

Films

Television
 Poppyland (1984 UK TV film, Screen Two)
 Prime Suspect 4
 After The War (UK TV Series)
 Inspector Morse episodes
 The Adventures of Sherlock Holmes episodes
 The Widowmaker 1990.  Madden insisted on casting David Morrissey in the lead.
 Masters of Sex pilot

Plays
Plays he has directed include Arthur Kopit's Wings, and the world premiere in 1980 of Jules Feiffer's Grown Ups at the American Repertory Theatre.

Radio
Between 1981 and 1996, Madden directed a series of radio adaptations of Star Wars in a BBC/NPR co-production, which included versions of Star Wars Episode IV: A New Hope (1981), The Empire Strikes Back (1983) and Return of the Jedi (1996) scripted for radio by Brian Daley.

Before it was produced for the stage, Madden directed Wings for NPR's Earplay series, in a production that won the Prix Italia.

References

External links

1949 births
Alumni of Sidney Sussex College, Cambridge
BAFTA winners (people)
English film directors
English television directors
English theatre directors
Living people
People educated at Clifton College
Mass media people from Portsmouth